Gunby is a surname. Notable people with the surname include:

John Gunby (1745–1807), American planter and soldier 
Peter Gunby (1934–2022), British footballer and coach
Steve Gunby (born 1984), British footballer
Trish Gunby, American politician